Rezvan ( meaning: Paradise or The Gatekeeper of Paradise) may refer to:
 Rəzvan, Azerbaijan
 Rezvan, Gilan, Iran
 Rezvan, Hormozgan, Iran
 Rezvan, Kerman, Iran
 Rezvan, alternate name of Rezvanabad, Kerman Province, Iran
 Rezvan, Khuzestan, Iran
 Rezvan, Razavi Khorasan, Iran
 Rezvan, Semnan, Iran
 Rezvan, South Khorasan, Iran
 Rezvan Rural District (disambiguation), various places in Iran

See also
 Rezvanshahr (disambiguation), various places in Iran